Intrepid Pictures is an American independent film and television production company dedicated to producing elevated commercial content for global mainstream audiences. It was founded in 2004 by Trevor Macy and Marc D. Evans, and is currently run by Trevor Macy and Mike Flanagan. The company is based in Los Angeles, California.

History 
Intrepid Pictures was founded in 2004 by founders and co-CEOs Trevor Macy and Marc D. Evans. Macy served as the sole CEO until 2019, at which time Mike Flanagan joined the company as a partner.

Before Intrepid was created, both Evans and Macy worked at Revolution Studios and Propaganda Films respectively. Evans spent 4 years at Revolution Studios as CFO from 2000 to 2004 while Macy spent 2 years as the COO of Propaganda Films and independently produced Auto Focus.

A year after forming the company, Rogue signed a deal with Intrepid to co-produce, co-finance and distribute films with partnership with Universal Studios, Rogue's then-parent company, for five years. The company then debuted with Waist Deep in 2006, which critically flopped but gained $21.35 million worldwide.

In February 2011, Melinda Nishioka was hired as a Coordinator, and as of September 2016 is the new Vice President of Development.

After stumbles, the group broke through with The Strangers. In May 2012 FilmDistrict acquired the film rights to what would become Oculus. Soon after, the film released on April 11, 2013, to commercial and critical success, earning $44 million over a $5 million budget and received positive reviews. In June 2015, Los Angeles Media Fund co-funded The Bye Bye Man, which originated from a script by Jonathan Penner with STX Entertainment acquiring the film in December.

Intrepid's most notable recent releases are the critically acclaimed films Hush, Before I Wake, Ouija: Origin of Evil and Gerald's Game, all with Flanagan, a frequent Intrepid collaborator and now partner.

In January 2018, Intrepid and Macy announced their involvement in Doctor Sleep, the sequel to the iconic horror film The Shining, for Warner Brothers.

In February 2019, it was announced that Flanagan had formally joined Intrepid as a partner, and that Intrepid had inked an overall deal with Netflix to generate television series. As part of that overall deal, Netflix ordered the original series Midnight Mass in July 2019.

On October 6, 2021 it was announced that Intrepid will create an eight episode limited series titled The Fall of the House of Usher for Netflix that will be based on the works of Edgar Allan Poe. Flanagan and Michael Fimognari will each direct four episodes and executive produce the series.

On December 1, 2022 it was announced that the company has inked a TV deal with Amazon Studios. Under the deal Macy and Flanagan will develop and produce projects under Intrepid for Amazon Prime Video, thus ending their deal with Netflix. Feature film productions were not part of the deal.

Filmography

Television

References 

Companies based in Santa Monica, California
Mass media companies established in 2004
American companies established in 2004
Film production companies of the United States
Television production companies of the United States